Roseville is an unincorporated community in Stafford County, in the U.S. state of Virginia.

On March 5, 2021 Minneapolis Minnesota recording artist and actor Har Mar Superstar released a record titled Roseville.

References

Unincorporated communities in Virginia
Unincorporated communities in Stafford County, Virginia